Edward Walter Curley (May 23, 1873 – January 6, 1940) was a Democratic member of the United States House of Representatives from New York from 1935 to 1940.

Biography 
Curley was born in Easton, Pennsylvania. He attended the College of the City of New York.

Political career 
He was a member of the New York City Council from 1916 until 1935. He was elected to Congress in 1935 to fill the vacancy caused by the death of Anthony J. Griffin and served from November 5, 1935, until his death in New York City.

See also
 List of United States Congress members who died in office (1900–49)

Sources

1873 births
1940 deaths
Politicians from Easton, Pennsylvania
City College of New York alumni
New York City Council members
Burials at Kensico Cemetery
Democratic Party members of the United States House of Representatives from New York (state)